Trinidad and Tobago–United Kingdom relations are foreign relations between Trinidad and Tobago and the United Kingdom. Both countries are full members of the Commonwealth of Nations.

History
Since the independence of Trinidad & Tobago in 1962, relations between the two countries have been mostly friendly and there are many areas in which both Trinidad and Tobago and the UK seek stronger ties for mutual benefit. There are also strong cultural and social ties between the two nations. In Trinidad and Tobago, English is one of the official languages, and Cricket is among the most popular sports. In the UK, Caribbean Carnival is hugely popular.

Economy
Trinidad and Tobago is the UK's largest export market in the Caribbean. The UK is the sixth largest supplier.

Bilateral agreements

Resident diplomatic missions
 Trinidad and Tobago has a high commission in London.
 United Kingdom has a high commission in Port of Spain.

See also
 Trinidadian and Tobagonian British

References

External links 

 
Bilateral relations of the United Kingdom
United Kingdom
United Kingdom and the Commonwealth of Nations
Trinidad and Tobago and the Commonwealth of Nations
Relations of colonizer and former colony